Queen Street (Chinese: 奎因街) is one of the oldest streets in Singapore and once had a very strong Eurasian presence. Beginning at Arab Street, Queen Street forms major junctions with Ophir Road, Rochor Road, Middle Road and Bras Basah Road before ending at the junction of Stamford Road.

History
The area around Stamford Canal, Dhoby Ghaut and Selegie Road was known for the laundry services provided by the dhobies (laundrymen) from the colonial days. Many schools of high regard like the Raffles Girls' Secondary School, Saint Joseph's Institution and the Catholic High School used to be located here.

Churches and hotels
Queen Street is known for the many churches that line it. The oldest Roman Catholic church still in existence, the Cathedral of the Good Shepherd, was built in 1847 with the churches of Saint Joseph's, Saints Peter and Paul and Our Lady of Lourdes following after. Other churches on this street include Kum Yan Methodist Church and Grace Singapore Chinese Church. The Central Sikh temple, the oldest in Singapore, which was built on Queen Street in the 1930s, was pulled down in the 1980s to make way for new development and moved to Towner Road. Flats and shops were built on its original site of Queen Street.

In June 2016, the Church of Saints Peter and Paul re-opened after completion of a one-year, $8 million restoration. The church, which was listed as a national monument in 2003, had cracks in the walls, a leaking roof, and termites. Because of the historic status of the church, the roof had to be repaired according to the original design; hundreds of nuts and bolts were used rather than welding.

Other buildings on this street include the Oxford Hotel, BOC Plaza, Mercure Singapore Bugis, Bugis+, Albert Centre Market and Food Centre, Fu Lu Shou Complex and some shophouses. Queen Street Bus Terminal is also located there. On 7 November 2015, an 11-storey China Cultural Centre opened. The building is part of an effort to encourage exchanges of art and culture between China and Singapore.

Arts and culture district
In 2014, the section of Queen Street between Bras Basah Road and Middle Road underwent substantial renovation as part of a project to develop the area into an arts and cultural district. Parking spots were removed, sidewalks were widened and benches installed in an effort to create space for holding public events, including in front of the Singapore Art Museum and the Waterloo Centre.

Variant names
Chinese names
Sek-a-ni Koi. Sekani in Hokkien (Min Nan) means Eurasian, reflecting the presence of Eurasians in the area.
San Ma Lu, which means "the third horseway".
Se Zai Nian Jie, meaning "Eurasian street", referring to the fact that the street was a part of the Eurasian enclave.
Tamil names
Dhoby Kampam and Vannan Teruvu, both mean "street of dhobies".
Malay name
Kampong Dhobi, a reference to the laundrymen that dominated the area.

References

Roads in Singapore
Downtown Core (Singapore)
Museum Planning Area
Rochor